David Henry Ward (born May 6, 1939 in Huntsville, Texas) is a broadcast journalist in Houston, Texas.  He was an anchor of the weekday 6:00 pm newscast on KTRK-TV's Eyewitness News in Houston, Texas for more than 50 years. He joined KTRK-TV in 1966 as reporter and photographer and was promoted to his final position as weekday evening anchor in 1968, and is the longest running news anchor in American television, surpassing the late Hal Fishman in 2015.

Career
Ward began his career at KGKB radio while attending Tyler Junior College (class of 1960).
Three years later, he began working at WACO-FM as a staff announcer. Later in 1963, Ward became the first full-time reporter at KNUZ radio, located in Houston. In 1966, he was hired on the spot at KTRK-TV:

He was hired as an on the street reporter and photographer in November 1966 and in 1967 was assigned to anchor KTRK's 7 a.m. newscast and a year later, he was promoted to co-anchor of the weekday 6 p.m. and 10 p.m. weekday newscasts. In December 2014, Ward announced he was leaving the weeknight 10 p.m. broadcast, but would still continue to co-anchor the weekday 6 p.m. newscast with Gina Gaston. In June 2016, Ward was recognized by the Guinness Book of World Records for having the longest tenure of any news anchor in the world at the same station in the same market. On August 4, 2016, Ward announced on the 6 p.m. news that he would be leaving KTRK at the end of the year. Soon after, Ward told the Houston Chronicle he was leaving against his will and did not want to retire, even after multiple falls in the newsroom left his health capricious. Ultimately, the station and Ward agreed to not renew his contract and that he would leave in December 2016.  Prior to that date, another health scare delayed his departure. Ward underwent an open heart surgery in December, and the managers at the station decided to let Ward have a final newscast appearance on May 2, 2017.

Ward, a personal friend of Marvin Zindler, helped Zindler obtain his position at Channel 13, by urging the station to hire him after Zindler had been fired from his job at the sheriff's department.

In May 2019, Ward published his memoir, “Good Evening, Friends.” The title reflects the salutation he used to begin each newscast at KTRK.

Positions and achievements
In addition to his television and radio career, he has played an active role in establishing Houston Crime Stoppers, currently serving as President of the local Easter Seals Society, and chairing the Public Affairs Advisory Board of the Houston Business Council.

Video

References

External links
 Dave Ward official site
 Biography by ABC 13
 Biography by H Texas magazine
 Ward's posthumous report on Marvin Zindler

1939 births
Living people
American television journalists
Television anchors from Houston
Journalists from Houston
Tyler Junior College alumni
Writers from Dallas
American male journalists
People from Huntsville, Texas